Hacıyusuf, formerly Sarıdana, is a village in the Kâhta District, Adıyaman Province, Turkey. The village is populated by Kurds of the Bezikan tribe and had a population of 150 in 2021.

The hamlet of Kınık is attached to Hacıyusuf.

References

Villages in Kâhta District
Kurdish settlements in Adıyaman Province